Offshore Helicopters A/S was an offshore and scheduled helicopter airline based at Bergen Airport, Flesland in Bergen, Norway. Established in 1974, the company lasted until 1980 when it merged with its main competitor, Helikopter Service. Offshore Helicopters flew mostly to Statfjord, and had at its peak eight helicopters. It flew a scheduled service from Bodø to Værøy between 1976 and 1979.

History
Through the late 1960s and early 1970s there was a boom in offshore oil exploration and later production. This led to a steady increase in offshore helicopter traffic, although initially only Helikopter Service was able to capture it. Three significant airlines therefore went together to form a challenger. Offshore Helicopters was incorporated by Fred. Olsen Airtransport, Helitourist and Mørefly on 31 October 1974. Its head office was located at Bergen Airport, Flesland, with a second base at Stavanger Airport, Sola. The airline received an offshore operating concession the same year.

The airline initially bought two fifteen-passenger Aérospatiale SA 330 Puma. There was a desire both among politicians and oil companies that there be created a challenger to Helikopter Service, but it proved difficult for Offshore Helicopters to secure significant contracts. Their main operations was a joint contract with Helikopter Service to fly to Statfjord. This involved an extensive cooperation with the larger company, forcing Offshore Helicopters to sell their Pumas and instead buy two Sikorsky S-61N and two Bell 212 in order to unify the fleets. All maintenance of the Sikorskys were done by Helikopter Service, although Offshore Helicopters maintained their Bells. By 1978 the fleet had increased to four aircraft of each class.

The airline operated a scheduled passenger service between 1976 and 1979, between Bodø Airport and the island of Værøy. The route was subsidized by the government and awarded to Widerøe, who also operated the rest of the subsidized regional network. Widerøe bought a Sikorsky S-58T, but subcontracted the operations to Offshore Helicopter. The company took over an old hangar at Bodø and had four people stationed there.

Mørefly and Helitourist eventually sold their shares to Fred. Olsen. In 1980 they have up operating the airline, and agreed to a merger with Helikopter Service. Fred. Olsen was paid in shares in the merged Helikopter Service, receiving an ownership share of fifteen percent.

References

Bibliography
 

Defunct airlines of Norway
Defunct helicopter airlines
Airlines established in 1974
Airlines disestablished in 1980
1980 disestablishments in Norway
Companies based in Bergen
Norwegian companies established in 1974